The Cabinet of Solomon Islands is the cabinet (executive branch) of the government of Solomon Islands. Solomon Islands has a Westminster system of government.

Current Cabinet

Cabinet as of the 2019 General Elections

References

Politics of the Solomon Islands
Solomon Islands